Beddoe–Rose Family Cemetery is a historic cemetery located in Keuka Lake State Park at Jerusalem in Yates County, New York.  It was established about 1815, and is a settlement era burial ground containing the graves of 14 members of the Beddoe and Rose families.  The cemetery remained an active burial ground until 1908. The farm property was acquired for Keuka Lake State Park in the 1950s and the farmhouse subsequently demolished.

It was listed on the National Register of Historic Places in 2014.

References

External links
 

Cemeteries on the National Register of Historic Places in New York (state)
1815 establishments in New York (state)
Buildings and structures in Yates County, New York
National Register of Historic Places in Yates County, New York